The Qaem  (or Ghaem) refers to two completely separate Iranian weapons: an air-to-ground glide bomb and a surface-to-air missile. These two weapons are similarly sized and identically named, and are both developed from the Toophan missile, but are separate weapon systems.

Qaem surface to air missile 
This is an Iranian SACLOS beam-riding SHORAD surface-to-air missile. With a range of six kilometers and a maximum altitude of two kilometers, the Qaem is intended for use against UAVs and low flying or stationary helicopters. The Qaem is a development of the Toophan missile, itself an unlicensed copy of the American BGM-71 TOW missile, and entered mass production in 2010.

The Qaem anti-aircraft missile uses a laser guidance system. Iran also produces a variant, the Qaem-M, which adds a proximity fuse.
 Ghaem-114 toophan missile comparable of AGM-114

Qaem air to ground bomb 

A completely unrelated Iranian munition, but also named "Qaem," is carried by Qods Mohajer-6 UAVs and Hamaseh UAVs.

The Qaem is available in four variants: the Qaem 1, with a suspected infrared seeker; a variant simply named Qaem, with suspected laser guidance; a larger variant named Qaem-5, with TV guidance; and an even larger variant named Qaem-9, also with TV guidance.

The Qaem A2G glide bomb is related to the Sadid-345 glide bomb, but has different wings and size.

References 

Guided missiles of Iran
Surface-to-air missiles of Iran
Post–Cold War weapons of Iran
Military equipment introduced in the 2010s